Beyond Software was a video game publisher in the UK in the 1980s. It was set up by the EMAP publishing group in 1983 and published numerous titles on the Commodore 64, Dragon 32, ZX Spectrum and Amstrad CPC, but met with very little success until the release of Mike Singleton's The Lords of Midnight in 1984. The Tolkien-esque strategy game became an instant success and allowed Beyond to establish a distribution deal with American developers First Star, as well as a publishing deal with developer Denton Designs.

After being acquired by Telecomsoft in late 1985<ref name="birds-beyond">Richard Hewison: Beyond.  from: The Bird Sanctuary. Accessed on 2009-12-10</ref> for a six-figure sum, Beyond continued to operate as a unique label, mostly releasing games that had already been in development for some time, as well as a number of conversions of existing titles. Telecomsoft did very little with the Beyond label beyond these releases. A number of high-profile titles, such as Star Trek: The Rebel Universe ended up on the Firebird label, while a highly anticipated Mike Singleton project, Eye of the Moon'', failed to materialise.

Games

References

External links

Defunct video game companies of the United Kingdom
Video game companies established in 1983
Video game publishers